Márton Kékesi (born 19 December 1995) is a member of the Hungarian national team in Alpine skiing.

Career
He competed at the 2015|2017 World Championships in St. Moritz, Switzerland Beaver Creek, US, in the Super-G.
In January 2012, Kékesi also participated at the first ever Winter Youth Olympics, competing in the 2012 Winter Youth Olympics – Man Alpine skiing in Slalom, Giant Slalom, Super Combined and Super-G disciplines, World Junior Alpine Skiing Championships 2012 Roccaraso, Italy and at the World Junior Alpine Skiing Championships 2013 Mont St Anne, Canada he took the first place in the U-18 category. His best result was a 26th place in the Slalom discipline.

He is also a multiple Hungarian champion. He has been nominated to represent Hungary in all disciplines 2018 Olympic Winter Games in PyeongChang, South Korea. During the races, he finished in all but Super G. His best result was the 30th place in slalom discipline.

Kekesi competed in slalom and giant slalom disciplines at the 2022 Olympic Winter Games in Beijing, China.

References

External links

1995 births
Living people
Hungarian male alpine skiers
Alpine skiers at the 2012 Winter Youth Olympics
Alpine skiers at the 2018 Winter Olympics
Alpine skiers at the 2022 Winter Olympics
Olympic alpine skiers of Hungary
Sportspeople from Miskolc